Sébastien Le Camus (ca. 1610-1677) was a French composer. He entered into the service of Louis XIII in 1640 and became intendant de la musique to Gaston d'Orléans in 1648.

References

1610s births
1677 deaths
French Baroque composers
French male classical composers
17th-century classical composers
17th-century male musicians